Anthony Thompson  was an Anglican priest in Ireland during the Eighteenth century.

Thompson was born at Shap and educated at Trinity College.   He was Dean of Raphoe from 1744 until 1757;  and then Vicar of Hutton Bonville.

Notes

18th-century Irish Anglican priests
People from Shap
Alumni of Trinity College, Cambridge
Deans of Raphoe